WGBG-FM (107.7 MHz, "Big 107.7") is an American radio station licensed to serve the community of Fruitland, Maryland with studios and cluster offices located in Salisbury, Maryland. The station's 23,000 watt signal can be heard at or near its transmitter on U.S. Route 50. Its tower is located in Pittsville, Maryland. The station broadcasts as a classic rock music formatted station branded as "Big 107.7". Programming features The Free Beer and Hot Wings Morning Radio Show, Doc West and Nights with Alice Cooper.

History
Prior to moving to Fruitland, the station was licensed to Exmore, Virginia, and broadcast on a frequency of 107.5 FM. While in Exmore, the station had the call letters WKRE-FM, broadcast with 50,000 watts of power, and featured a country music format. Prior to February 4, 2009, the station broadcast an Adult hits format as "Joe FM".

On September 4, 2015, the then-WKHI changed their format from classic rock to country, branded as "Your Country K107-7".

On August 17, 2018 at 5 p.m., WKHI changed their format from country to a simulcast of classic rock-formatted WGBG-FM 98.5 Seaford, Delaware, branded as "Big 107.7" under new WGBG-FM calls.

Transmitter
The transmitter is a class B1 transmitter, 23,000 watts, HAAT 104.8 meters, located in Pittsville, Maryland.  Facility ID 4107. Located at coordinates

Previous logo

References

External links

GBG-FM
Classic rock radio stations in the United States
Radio stations established in 1972
1972 establishments in Virginia